StarDict, developed by Hu Zheng (胡正), is a free GUI released under the GPL-3.0-or-later license for accessing StarDict dictionary files (a dictionary shell). It is the successor of StarDic, developed by Ma Su'an (馬蘇安), continuing its version numbers.

According to StarDict's earlier homepage on SourceForge, the project has been removed from SourceForge due to copyright infringement reports. It moved to Google Code and then back to SourceForge, while development is now seemingly continued on GitHub.

Supported platforms
StarDict runs under Linux, Windows, FreeBSD, Maemo and Solaris. Dictionaries of the user's choice are installed separately. Dictionary files can be created by converting dict files.

Several programs compatible with the StarDict dictionary format are available for different platforms.
For the iPhone, iPod Touch and iPad, applications available in the App Store include GuruDic, TouchDict, weDict, Dictionary Universal, Alpus and others, as well as the free iStarDict, which is available for the Cydia Store.

Dictionaries available
One can find here the partial list of FreeDict dictionaries which can be converted to the StarDict format. These include, in particular, some older versions of Webster's dictionary and many dictionaries for various languages.

Features
While StarDict is in scan mode, results are displayed in a tooltip, allowing easy dictionary lookup. When combined with Freedict, StarDict will quickly provide rough translations of foreign language websites.

On September 25, 2006, an online version of Stardict began operation. This online version includes access to all the major dictionaries of StarDict, as well as Wikipedia in Chinese.

Previous versions of StarDict were very similar to the PowerWord dictionary program, which is developed by a Chinese company, KingSoft. Since version 2.4.2, however, StarDict has diverged from the design of PowerWord by increasing its search capabilities and adding lexicons in a variety of languages. This was assisted by the collaboration of many developers with the author.

Evgeniy A. Dushistov produced the command line version of StarDict called sdcv.

See also
 Machine translation
 sdcv

References

External links

 Stardict project Github page, Sourceforge page, Google Code archived page
 RPM resource stardict-dictionary
 How to install StarDict on Linux maemo os2008 (in Russian)

DICT clients
Free dictionary software
Free software programmed in C++
Dictionary software that uses GTK
Machine translation
Translation dictionaries
Dictionary formats
Language software for Linux
Language software for Windows